Cardinal Bernard Maciejowski, Ciołek coat of arms (1548 – 19 January 1608 in Kraków), Polish nobleman, starosta, royal standard bearer, statesman and Catholic Church leader; Lutsk bishop, Archbishop of Kraków, Archbishop of Gniezno and Primate of Poland (between 1606 and 1608).

Biography
Maciejowski was a scion (descendant) of powerful family, being a son of Bernard Maciejowski, starosta of Trembowla (now Terebovlia), castelan of Lublin and Radom, and his wife Elżbieta Kamieniecka, Piława coat of arms. His uncle, Samuel Maciejowski, was the archbishop of Kraków.
He studied at the Jesuit College in Vienna. Since 1570 he became  vexillifer regni (royal standard-bearer) of king Sigismund II Augustus. He participated as a soldier during 1579–1581 in the Livonian campaign of Stephen Báthory during the Stephen Bathory's reign over the Polish–Lithuanian Commonwealth. Under the influence of the Polish influential Jesuit Piotr Skarga Maciejowski decided to study theology in Rome, which he started in 1582. There, in 1586 he took Holy Orders and became a presbyter, and later on the same year he became a canon in Poland's capital, Kraków. Upon King Stephen's death he supported Sigismund III Vasa's election. Then he was sent by the new king to Rome as his diplomatic envoy to the pope. He was then rewarded by the new king with a seat of bishop of the diocese of Łuck in 1588. In his function of Bishop of Lutsk he founded and had built a Jesuit college in Lublin  in 1591–1596. He was part of the preparations leading to the Union of Brest.
In 1600 he was again promoted as he became a bishop of Kraków, his  ingressus (official entry) into the Wawel Cathedral took place on 12 August 1600.

Bishop Bernard called a council of church (synod) in his diocese in  1601, and upon its conclusion published a pastoral epistle addressed to the Parsons of his diocese, and this publication is considered today as the first Christian ministry textbook. His then famous and important pastoral epistle had come to be distributed and publicized in the whole country in 1607. In 1603  Pope Clement VIII nominated Maciejowski to a position of cardinal. In 1606 he became the archbishop of Gniezno, the most important Church position in the country, also one of the most important positions in the functioning of the state, as during the Polish interregnum the archbishop of Gniezno was also an Interrex.
Maciejowski started reforming the Polish Church in the spirit and teachings of the Council of Trident. In his capacity of the archbishop of Poland was a follower of the Counter-Reformation, and he endorsed and sought to venerate Jadwiga of Poland and her black Crucifix located at the Wawel Cathedral. Since 1603 he had promoted the veneration of John Cantius, future saint.
He was involved in the Jan Latosz controversy and professor's removal from the Jagiellonian University. During his tenure as the bishop of Kraków and archbishop of Poland, Maciejowski had many repairs and rebuilding projects carried under his wings, in Kraków and elsewhere. He was famous for his charity work and services.
Maciejewski married the future tsar Dimitriy Ioannovich (False Dmitriy I) and future tsarina Maryna Mniszech (Marina Mniszech).

Maciejowski had the now famous Maciejowski Bible, and this book was attached along with other gifts of the Polish Crown royal diplomatic envoy by king Sigismund III Vasa to shah Abbas I of Persia. The inscription on the bottom of the first page on the manuscript says: Potentissimo Persarum Regi, Bernardus Macieuskius sacrae Romanae Ecclesiae Presbiter Cardinalis Episcopus Cracouiensis Dux Sebierinesis Regni Poloniae Senator veram felicitatem exoptans offert Cracoviae Regni Poloniae Metropoli Die spetima Septembris Anno Salutis Humanae Millesimo sexcentesimo quarto.

He was buried in the Wawel Cathedral, in a chapel bearing his own family name  (Maciejowski Chapel), where his uncle, Bishop Samuel Maciejowski, also was buried. There is a surviving portrait of Maciejowski, located at the St. Francis of Assisi's Church, Kraków, the monastery that he ordered rebuilt.
His contemporary chronicler Rajnold Hejdensztejn (Reinhold Heidenstein)  in his work Rerum Polonicarum praised Maciejowski's literacy and learning.

Bibliography

 Reinhold Heidenstein, Rerum Polonicarum ab excessu Sigismundi Augusti libri XII, Frankfurt a/Main 1672
 M. Gliszczyński (editor)  "Dzieje Polski do śmierci Zygmunta Augusta do r. 1594, t. 1-2, Petersburg 1857,
 Kasper Niesiecki,Polish Armorial - "Korona Polska przy złotey wolnosci starożytnemi Rycerstwa Polskiego y Wielkiego Xięstwa Litewskiego kleynotami naywyższymi Honorami Heroicznym, Męstwem y odwagą, Wytworną Nauką a naypierwey Cnotą, nauką Pobożnością, y Swiątobliwością ozdobiona Potomnym zaś wiekom na zaszczyt y nieśmiertelną sławę Pamiętnych w tey Oyczyźnie Synow podana TOM ... Przez X. Kaspra Niesieckego Societatis Jesu", Lwów (now Lviv), 1738, vol 6, p 310–314.

References

External links
 Virtual tour Gniezno Cathedral  
List of Primates of Poland 

1548 births
1608 deaths
17th-century Polish cardinals
Archbishops of Gniezno
Bishops of Kraków
Canons of Kraków
Ecclesiastical senators of the Polish–Lithuanian Commonwealth
Polish people of the Livonian campaign of Stephen Báthory
Burials at Wawel Cathedral
Diplomats of the Polish–Lithuanian Commonwealth
Clan of Ciołek